Clifford Godfrey (17 February 1909 – 1986) was an English professional footballer. He was born in Baildon, Yorkshire.

Godfrey began his career at Guiseley while also working as a miner. In 1928 he signed for Bradford Park Avenue and, despite spending six seasons at the club, never fully managed to hold down a first team place. He was allowed to join Cardiff City in 1935 where he did manage to establish himself in the side, being ever present during the 1936–37 season, as well as captaining the side on numerous occasions. At the start of the 1937–38 season he scored his only goal for the club in a 4–1 win over Northampton Town. In 1938 he moved to Walsall where he played in the last season before the outbreak of World War II. He continued to play for the club during the war but retired before the return of the Football League in 1946.

References

1909 births
1986 deaths
Date of death missing
Place of death missing
People from Baildon
Footballers from West Yorkshire
English footballers
Association football defenders
Guiseley A.F.C. players
Bradford (Park Avenue) A.F.C. players
Cardiff City F.C. players
Walsall F.C. players
English Football League players